Chulachomklao Royal Military Academy (CRMA) ( or รร.จปร.) is the service academy of Royal Thai Army (RTA). Established in 1887 it has graduated the majority of Thailand's military leaders, many of whom have become Thai prime ministers. The academy has an intense training program. There are about 200 cadets in each class.

History
CRMA was founded on 5 August 1887 by King Chulachomklao, King Rama V, also known as King Chulalongkorn. It was originally called the Royal Military Academy.  On 1 January 1948, it was merged with the Royal Thai Army Polytechniques Institute, under the new name Chulachomklao Royal Military Academy in the honor of King Chulachomklao.

Chulachomklao Royal Military Academy was originally in the precinct of Saranrom Palace in Bangkok, where it remained for 77 years. In 1909 the academy was moved to Ratchadamnoen Nok Avenue in Bangkok. On 10 July 1986, it moved to its new sprawling complex at Khao Cha-ngoke, Mueang District of Nakhon Nayok Province, 140 km northeast of Bangkok.

Cadets

The academy admits only male applicants after three years attendance at the armed forces prep school (AFAPS).

In every academic year, eight to ten scholarships are offered by the Royal Thai Army to academically outstanding first-year cadets to pursue studies at foreign military institutes.

At the end of the fourth year, cadets graduate with a bachelor's degree in their chosen field of study and are commissioned as second lieutenants in the Royal Thai Army.

Major organizations within the academy are the academy headquarters, corps of cadets, the academic division, military education department, physical training section, services section, and an infantry battalion supporting the academy. Cadets have a set daily schedule. It begins at approximately 05:30. After taking care of their personal hygiene, studying for one hour, and breakfast, the academic schedule starts at 08:00 and ends at 15:00. Either military training or sports is scheduled every day from 15:30 until 17:00. Self study is scheduled again after dinner from 19:00 until 21:00.

Annual military training starts in January after the second academic semester ends. Each class is scheduled for specific training. For example, first year cadets might be trained at the infantry center. Third year cadets, who have passed the selection process, might undergo parachute training and fourth year cadets, Ranger school.

Curriculum
Bachelor of Engineering

Bachelor of Science

Bachelor of Arts

Alumni
Distinguished alumni include:
 Field Marshal Plaek Phibunsongkhram, Prime Minister from 1938–1944 and 1948–1957.
 Field Marshal Sarit Thanarat, Prime Minister from 1957–1963.
General Kriangsak Chomanan, Prime Minister from 1977–1980.
 General Prem Tinsulanonda, Prime Minister from 1980–1988.
 General Surayud Chulanont, Prime Minister from 2006–January 2008.
 General Prayut Chan-o-cha, the current prime minister of Thailand.

See also 
 Royal Thai Air Force Academy
 Royal Thai Naval Academy
 Armed Forces Academies Preparatory School
 National Defence College of Thailand

References

External links
http://www.crma.ac.th Chulachomklao Royal Military Academy

 
Nakhon Nayok province
Educational institutions established in 1887
Institutes of higher education in Thailand
1887 establishments in Siam